Hayti High School is a high school located in Hayti, Missouri.

Notable alumni
William Moore, a former Missouri Tiger college safety. Now retired NFL strong safety from the NFL that spent his entire career with the Atlanta Falcons.

References

External links

Public high schools in Missouri
Schools in Pemiscot County, Missouri